Markus Christoph Blocher (born April 16, 1971) is a Swiss businessman and billionaire. He is the only son of former Federal Councilor Christoph Blocher (b. 1940) and younger brother of National Councilor Magdalena Martullo-Blocher (b. 1969). Blocher is among the richest Swiss with an estimated net worth of $3.4 billion by Forbes. Blocher holds a controlling stake in EMS-Chemie and Dottikon ES, both chemical companies based in Switzerland.

Early life and education 
Blocher was born April 16, 1971 in Zürich, Switzerland to Christoph and Silvia (née Kaiser) Blocher. His godmother is Rosmarie Ebner, the wife of the Swiss financier Martin Ebner. His elder sister is now the CEO of EMS-Chemie and a member of the National Council for the Swiss People's Party. He primarily grew up in Feldmeilen on Lake Zurich. He completed a student exchange in the United States and had the desire to join the United States Army in his teens. In 2000, he completed his doctorate at the Swiss Federal Institute of Technology (ETH).

Career 
After his graduation he worked for three years as a consultant for McKinsey & Company. Since 2002, he worked as Vice President of Special Projects at EMS-Chemie in Domat/Ems. In 2003, he was appointed managing director of Dottikon ES, which at that time still was part of EMS Group. Blocher was responsible for listing the company at the stock exchange in 2005. In November of the same year he exchanged his controlling shares of EMS with his sisters of Dottikon, and became majority owner. Until this day he acts as CEO and chairman of the board. In 2020, he was awarded the title 'Swiss CEO of the year' in the Obermatt ranking.

Personal life 
He is married and has seven children. Blocher resides in Wollerau.

References 

1971 births
Swiss billionaires
People from Zürich
McKinsey & Company people
Living people